PunkFunkRootsRock is the second album by the band Man Raze. A music video for "Fire" was released.

Track list
 Over My Dead Body
 I C U In Everything
 All I Wanna Do
 Closer to Me
 Lies Lies All Lies
 Get Action
 Edge of the World
 Dreamland
 Fire
 I, Superbiker
 Bittersweet
 Dog Bite

Personnel
 Phil Collen - guitar, vocals
 Simon Laffy - bass
 Paul Cook - drums

References

Man Raze albums
2011 albums